Akiko Yonemura and Tomoko Yonemura were the defending champions, but both chose not to participate.

Nina Bratchikova and Irena Pavlovic won the title, defeating Marina Melnikova and Sofia Shapatava in the final, 6–2, 6–4.

Seeds

Draw

References 
 Draw

Open Diputacion Ciudad de Pozoblanco - Doubles
Women
Open Diputación Ciudad de Pozoblanco doubles